Maxwell Ansah (born 21 April 1998) is a Ghanaian professional footballer who plays as defender for Ococias Kyoto in the Kansai Soccer League, one of the regional leagues of Japan comprising the fifth tier of japanese football.

Career 
Ansah started his career with lower division side Dawhenya United before moving to International Allies in 2016–17 season. He had to wait for close to two seasons to make his Inter Allies debut on 2 May 2018, playing the full 90 minutes in a 3–2 Ghana Premier League (GPL) loss to Dreams. In March 2018, he signed a contract extension with Inter Allies. After the expiration of his contract with in 2019, he joined Ghana Division One League side Vision.

On 29 October 2020, Ansah joined Dansoman-based club Liberty Professionals on a two-year deal. He made his debut on 5 December 2020 starting and playing the full 90 minutes in a 1–0 loss to Berekum Chelsea. On 7 February 2021, he was adjudged the NASCO man of the match award after putting up an impressive performance and helping Liberty keep a clean sheet in their 1–0 victory over Ashanti Gold.
He scored his first GPL goal on 29 May 2021, scoring the winning goal to push Liberty to a 2–1 comeback victory over Dreams after Abraham Wayo scored the equalizer.

References

External links 
 

Living people
1998 births
Ghanaian footballers
Liberty Professionals F.C. players
International Allies F.C. players
Ghana Premier League players
Association football defenders
Vision F.C. players